Insu is a village in Yenişehir district, which is an intracity district within Greater Mersin, Turkey. The population of the village was 178  as of 2012. After 2019, the southern part of the village became popular as a summer resort. Now Insu is popular with 'country houses'. It is a leisure destination for families. Some of the new houses are modern style including pools, too. Lately Insu became a place like 'a neighborhood that is out of city'.

References